Hampus Forsling (born June 19, 1994) is a Swedish ice hockey player. He is currently playing with Linköpings HC of the Swedish Hockey League (SHL).

Forsling made his debut with Linköpings HC during the 2013 European Trophy.

References

External links

1994 births
Linköping HC players
Living people
Ice hockey people from Gothenburg
Swedish ice hockey left wingers